Carmen is a 1943 Argentine musical comedy film directed by Luis César Amadori and starring Niní Marshall, Juan José Padilla and Adrián Cuneo.

The film's art direction was by Raúl Soldi.

Cast
 Niní Marshall as Carmen
 Juan José Padilla as Escamillo
 Adrián Cuneo as Don José
 Juan José Piñeiro
 Manuel Perales
 Nelly Darén
 Carlos Tajes

References

Bibliography 
 Ann Davies & Phil Powrie. Carmen on Screen: An Annotated Filmography and Bibliography. Tamesis Books, 2006.

External links 
 

1943 films
1943 musical comedy films
1940s Spanish-language films
Films based on Carmen
Films directed by Luis César Amadori
Argentine musical comedy films
1940s Argentine films